York is a city in Sumter County, Alabama, United States. Founded around 1838 after the merging of two communities, Old Anvil and New York Station, the latter a station on a stagecoach line. The rail came through in the 1850s and later, the "New" was dropped from York Station in 1861. With the discovery that another community in Alabama bore that name, the "Station" was dropped and York was formally incorporated on April 6, 1881. At the 2010 census the population was 2,538, down from 2,854 in 2000. From 1920 to 1980, it was the largest town in the county. Since 1990, it has been the second largest city behind the county seat of Livingston.

Geography

Demographics

2000 census
At the 2000 census there were 2,854 people in 1,046 households, including 689 families, in the city. The racial makeup of the city was 20.71% White, 78.31% Black or African American, 0.07% Native American, 0.07% Asian, 0.04% Pacific Islander, 0.04% from other races, and 0.77% from two or more races. 1.09% of the population were Hispanic or Latino of any race.
Of the 1,046 households 33.2% had children under the age of 18 living with them, 33.4% were married couples living together, 28.8% had a female householder with no husband present, and 34.1% were non-families. 31.6% of households were one person and 13.9% were one person aged 65 or older. The average household size was 2.61 and the average family size was 3.34.

The age distribution was 30.4% under the age of 18, 9.1% from 18 to 24, 24.8% from 25 to 44, 18.3% from 45 to 64, and 17.4% 65 or older. The median age was 34 years. For every 100 females, there were 75.6 males. For every 100 females age 18 and over, there were 66.4 males.

The median household income was $19,153 and the median family income  was $23,417. Males had a median income of $28,362 versus $15,438 for females. The per capita income for the city was $11,792. About 34.6% of families and 38.1% of the population were below the poverty line, including 50.6% of those under age 18 and 27.5% of those age 65 or over.

2010 census
At the 2010 census there were 2,538 people in 1,023 households, including 611 families, in the city. The racial makeup of the city was 85.3% Black or African American, 13.3% White, 0.2% Native American, <0.1% Asian and 0.2% from two or more races. 1.0% of the population were Hispanic or Latino of any race.
Of the 1,023 households 26.5% had children under the age of 18 living with them, 23.8% were married couples living together, 31.1% had a female householder with no husband present, and 40.3% were non-families. 36.9% of households were one person and 14.3% were one person aged 65 or older. The average household size was 2.35 and the average family size was 3.11.

The age distribution was 26.6% under the age of 18, 8.9% from 18 to 24, 21.0% from 25 to 44, 26.1% from 45 to 64, and 17.4% 65 or older. The median age was 38.5 years. For every 100 females, there were 76.9 males. For every 100 females age 18 and over, there were 74.0 males.

The median household income was $19,000 and the median family income  was $19,152. Males had a median income of $38,654 versus $22,007 for females. The per capita income for the city was $13,577. About 41.5% of families and 42.7% of the population were below the poverty line, including 63.1% of those under age 18 and 17.4% of those age 65 or over.

2020 census

As of the 2020 United States Census, there were 2,414 people, 962 households, and 474 families residing in the city.

Culture
York is home to the Coleman Center for Arts and Culture. The center is known for its artist in residency program, where prominent artists are invited to reside in the town and produce work specific to the town. In 2013, artist Matthew Mazzotta created Open House on a neglected property in the center of York. Open House appears as a small pink house that transforms into a 100-person open-air theatre for public venues.

Education
Sumter County School District operates public schools serving York: York West End Junior High School and Sumter Central High School. It was previously served by Sumter County High School in York until it merged into Sumter Central High in 2011.

Sumter Academy, a private school, was in an unincorporated area near York. It closed in 2017.

Notable people

Bobby Collins, former NFL player.
Marko Mitchell, American football wide receiver
Dale Steele, former American football coach
Davey Williams, experimental guitarist and improviser

References

External links
The Coleman Center for the Arts

Cities in Alabama
Cities in Sumter County, Alabama